Harald Weyel (born 30 August 1959) is a German politician. Born in Herborn, Hesse, he represents Alternative for Germany (AfD). Harald Weyel has served as a member of the Bundestag from the state of North Rhine-Westphalia since 2017.

Life 
He became member of the bundestag after the 2017 German federal election. He is a member of the Committee on European Union Affairs.

References

External links 

  
 Bundestag biography 

1959 births
Living people
Members of the Bundestag for North Rhine-Westphalia
Members of the Bundestag 2021–2025
Members of the Bundestag 2017–2021
Members of the Bundestag for the Alternative for Germany
German people of African-American descent